News from Nowhere is an 1890 book by William Morris.

News from Nowhere may also refer to:

 News from Nowhere (Air Supply album), 1995
 News from Nowhere (Darkstar album), 2013
 News from Nowhere: Journal of the Oxford English Faculty Opposition, magazine
 The News from Nowhere, a 2014 album by The Hoosiers
 News from Nowhere. Television and the News, a 1973 book by Edward Jay Epstein
 News from Nowhere, a 1986 novel by David Caute